Queck is a surname. Notable people with the surname include:

Elise Queck, (married Augustat; 1889– 1940), German politician
Gustav Queck (1822–1897), German educator and classical philologist
Horst Queck (born 1943), German ski jumper
Richard Queck (1888–1968), German footballer